Catherine Clinton is the Denman Professor of American History  at the University of Texas at San Antonio. She specializes in American History, with an emphasis on the history of the South, the American Civil War, American women, and African American history.

Career

Clinton grew up in Kansas City, Missouri, where she graduated from the Sunset Hill School in 1969. Thereafter, she studied sociology and African-American History at Harvard University (Lowell House), graduating in 1973. Clinton received her Ph.D. from Princeton University in 1980, after completing her dissertation on under the direction of James M. McPherson.

She has held academic positions at numerous institutions of higher learning, including Union College, Harvard University, Brandeis University, Brown University, Wofford College, The University of Richmond, Wesleyan University, Baruch College of the City University of New York and The Citadel. She currently holds a chair in American History at UTSA.

She has written for the History Channel, consulted on projects for WGBH, and is a member of the Screen Writers Guild, and has authored, edited, co-authored or co-edited more than twenty-five  books to date. She is editor of a series titled VIEWPOINTS ON AMERICAN CULTURE (Oxford University Press).

She serves on the scholarly advisory board of both Ford's Theatre and the Lincoln Cottage, as well as the following journals: Civil War Times and CIVIL WAR HISTORY.

She has been an advisor on several documentaries, including Brother, Outsider: The life of Bayard Rustin and Rebel: Loreta Velasquez, Civil War Soldier and Spy (about Loreta Janeta Velásquez), as well as Steven Spielberg's Lincoln (2011).

Personal life 
Clinton currently lives in San Antonio, Texas. She has two sons, Drew Colbert (born 1984 in Boston, MA) and Ned Colbert (born 1989 in Boston, MA). Drew currently holds the position of Senior Congressional Affairs Specialist at the Federal Housing Finance Agency. Ned holds the position of Communication Coordinator at NAESP. Both sons are located in Washington, D.C.

Selected recent works
 Mary Chesnut's Diary, Penguin Classic Edition (2011) 
Harriet Tubman: The Road to Freedom (New York, 2004) [Best Non-Fiction in 2004: Christian Science Monitor & Chicago Tribune] HISTORY BOOK CLUB SELECTION 
MRS. LINCOLN: A LIFE (HarperCollins, 2009) HISTORY BOOK CLUB SELECTION, BOOK OF THE MONTH SELECTION 
The Plantation Mistress: Woman's World in the Old South (Pantheon, 1982) including chapter: "FOUCAULT MEETS MANDINGO"
DIVIDED HOUSES: Gender and the Civil War [Co-editor] (New York: Oxford University Press, 1992) HISTORY BOOK CLUB SELECTION
HALF-SISTERS OF HISTORY: Southern Women and the American Past [editor] (Durham, N.C.: Duke University Press, 1994)
 Taking Off the White Gloves: Southern Women and Women's History, Michele Gillespie and Catherine Clinton, eds. (Columbia, MO 1998)
 LIFE IN CIVIL WAR AMERICA [commissioned by the NATIONAL PARK SERVICE] (Eastern National Press, 1996)
 CIVIL WAR STORIES (Athens: University of Georgia Press, 1998) Averitt Lecture Series, Georgia Southern University.
 PUBLIC WOMEN AND THE CONFEDERACY (Marquette University Press, 1999) Frank B. Klement Lecture, Marquette University.
 Tara Revisited:  Woman, War, & the Plantation Legend (Abbeville, 1995)
 COLUMBIA GUIDE TO AMERICAN WOMEN IN THE NINETEENTH CENTURY [co-author] (New York: Columbia University Press, 2000)
 The Devil's Lane: Sex and Race in the Early South, Catherine Clinton and Michele Gillespie, eds. (New York: Oxford University Press, 1997)
 Fanny Kemble's Journals (Cambridge, MA, 2000)
 THE OTHER CIVIL WAR: American Women in the Nineteenth Century (1984, 2nd edition, New York: Hill and Wang, 1999) 
 PORTRAITS OF AMERICAN WOMEN: From Settlement to the Present [co-editor] (1991, reprint edition, Oxford University Press, 1998)
 SOUTHERN FAMILIES AT WAR: Loyalty and Conflict in the Civil War South [editor] (New York: Oxford University Press, 2000)
 TAKING OFF THE WHITE GLOVES: Southern Women and Women Historians [co-editor] (Columbia: University of Missouri Press, 1998)
 PUBLIC WOMEN AND THE CONFEDERACY (Marquette University Press, 1999) Frank B. Klement Lecture, Marquette University.
 Fanny Kemble's Civil Wars (Simon & Schuster, 2000 & reprint edition: Oxford, 2006)
 BATTLE SCARS: GENDER AND SEXUALITY IN THE  CIVIL WAR [co-editor]  (Oxford University Press, 2006)
 REMINISCENCES OF MY LIFE IN CAMP: AN AFRICAN-AMERICAN WOMAN'S CIVIL WAR MEMOIR (University of Georgia Press, 2006)
 I, TOO, SING AMERICA: Three Centuries of African American Poetry [editor] (Boston: Houghton Mifflin Children, 1998)  Winner of the Bank Street Poetry Prize 1998 &  American Library Association, Best Books for Young Adults in 1998
THE SCHOLASTIC ENCYCLOPEDIA OF THE CIVIL WAR (author) (New York: Scholastic Press, 1999)
THE BLACK SOLDIER (Boston: Houghton Mifflin Children, 2000)
A POEM OF HER OWN: Women's Voices Past and Present (New York: Harry Abrams, 2003) New York Public Library Best Children's Book List
HOLD THE FLAG HIGH (New York: HarperCollins Children, 2005)
BOOTH (under the name C. C. Colbert) Illustrated by Tanitoc (New York: First Second Books, 2010)

References

External links
Catherine Clinton author homepage

http://www.utsa.edu/today/2014/11/catherineclinton.html

1962 births
Living people
21st-century American historians
American women historians
Princeton University alumni
Harvard University alumni
Wesleyan University faculty
Harvard University faculty
The Citadel, The Military College of South Carolina faculty
Wofford College faculty
University of Texas at San Antonio faculty
University of Richmond faculty
Union College (New York) faculty
21st-century American women writers